Hector's River Airstrip (Local ID code: JM-0016) is an airstrip serving  Bath, a village in the Saint Thomas Parish of Jamaica.

See also

Transport in Jamaica
List of airports in Jamaica

References

External links
OpenStreetMap - Bath

Airports in Jamaica